Farrell Mac an Ruagaire, Irish anchorite, died 1488.

The Annals of the Four Masters contain the only known reference to Farrell, sub anno 1488:

References

 http://www.ucc.ie/celt/published/T100005D/

Medieval Gaels from Ireland
15th-century Irish people
1488 deaths